Tecticornia bibenda is a species of plant in the subfamily Salicornioideae of the family Amaranthaceae from Western Australia. Its segmented stem gives it an appearance similar to the Michelin Man.  T. bibenda ranked tenth in the top species of 2008 by the International Institute for Species Exploration.

References

bibenda
Caryophyllales of Australia
Halophytes
Eudicots of Western Australia
Plants described in 2007
Taxa named by Kelly Anne Shepherd